Kim Jae-hyun is a South Korean drummer, actor, model and singer. He is known for his roles in dramas such as Modern Farmer, Sisters-in-law and Kimi to Sekai ga Owaru Hi ni: Season 1. He is a member of the South Korean band N.Flying.

Personal life
He studied at Kyung Hee Cyber University and his older sister Kim Jae-kyung is also an actress and singer.

Filmography

Television series

Web series

References

External links
 
 

1994 births
Living people
21st-century South Korean male actors
South Korean male models
South Korean male television actors
South Korean male idols
South Korean male singers
South Korean pop singers